Liberty State Park is a station on the Hudson–Bergen Light Rail (HBLR) located between Communipaw and Johnston Avenues in Jersey City, New Jersey. The station opened on April 15, 2000. There are two tracks and two side platforms.

Northbound service from the station is available to Hoboken Terminal and Tonnelle Avenue in North Bergen. Southbound service is available to terminals at West Side Avenue in Jersey City or 8th Street in Bayonne. 1248 park and ride spaces are also available one block from the station at the Liberty Science Center. A HBLR yard is located west of the line, south of this station.  South of here, the line is in a railroad easement, and speeds are higher than in the parts where it is a streetcar line. New Jersey Transit has been considering a spur from the station to the old Central Railroad of New Jersey Communipaw Terminal within Liberty State Park since at least 2010.

Station layout

Nearby attractions 
Liberty State Park
Liberty Science Center
Bergen-Lafayette, Jersey City
Communipaw Terminal

Gallery

Artwork

References

External links

 Station from Google Maps Street View
 Platforms from Google Maps Street View

Hudson-Bergen Light Rail stations
Transportation in Jersey City, New Jersey
Railway stations in the United States opened in 2000
2000 establishments in New Jersey